Irwin is an unincorporated community in southwestern Union Township, Union County, Ohio, United States. Irwin has a post office which serves the surrounding area, including the community of Rosedale.

History
A post office has been in operation at Irwin since 15 May 1858. The community was named for one Mr. Irwin, a pioneer settler.

Located near Irwin is Elmwood Place, a historic farm that is listed on the National Register of Historic Places.

References

Unincorporated communities in Union County, Ohio
Unincorporated communities in Ohio